Sukhvor-e Namdar-e Abdi (also Romanized as Sūkhvor-e Nāmdār-e ‘Abdī and Sūkhvor Nāmdār ‘Abdī; also known as Sūkhar-e Nāmdār, Sūkhūr-e ‘Abdī, Sūkhūr-e Nāmdār-e ‘Ebadī, and Sūkhūr-e Nāmdār-e Elāhī) is a village in Heydariyeh Rural District, Govar District, Gilan-e Gharb County, Kermanshah Province, Iran. At the 2006 census, its population was 315, in 66 families.

References 

Populated places in Gilan-e Gharb County